The Barricade is a 1917 American silent drama film directed by Edwin Carewe and starring Mabel Taliaferro, Frank Currier and Clifford Bruce.

Cast
 Mabel Taliaferro as Hope Merrill 
 Frank Currier as Amos Merrill 
 Clifford Bruce as John Cook 
 Robert Rendel as Gerald Hastings 
 Emile Collins as Butler 
 Lorna Volare as Flower Girl 
 Mary Doyle as Flower Girl

References

Bibliography
 Lowe, Denise. An Encyclopedic Dictionary of Women in Early American Films: 1895-1930. Routledge, 2014.

External links
 

1917 films
1917 drama films
1910s English-language films
American silent feature films
Silent American drama films
American black-and-white films
Films directed by Edwin Carewe
Metro Pictures films
Films produced by B. A. Rolfe
1910s American films